San Francisquito Pass is a mountain pass in the Sierra Pelona Mountains, located northeast of Green Valley and Santa Clarita, in northern Los Angeles County, California.

Geography

The pass, at the elevation , is at the head of San Francisquito Canyon. San Francisquito Canyon Road, crossing over the Sierra Pelonas here, leads to Elizabeth Lake in the Leona Valley to the north, and Saugus to the south.

History
San Francisquito Pass was on the El Camino Viejo, an alternate land route to the El Camino Real for reaching northern Spanish and Mexican colonial Alta California. It connected the Pueblo of Los Angeles and San Fernando Valley with the San Joaquin Valley. The El Camino Viejo horse and wagon trail next crossed the Tehachapi Mountains into the San Joaquin Valley at Old Tejón Pass.

The route's successor, the Stockton - Los Angeles Road, used San Francisquito Pass and Fort Tejon Pass (west of Old Tejón Pass). The Butterfield Overland Mail route (1857-1861) followed the Stockton—Los Angeles Road between the San Fernando and San Joaquin Valleys, and used both passes. It had a stagecoach stops at King's Station (southern canyon) and Widow Smith's Station (near pass) in San Francisquito Canyon.

San Francisquito Pass was used by the major inland north-south routes until the opening of the Ridge Route in 1915.

Present day
The pass continues to be used by San Francisquito Canyon Road, which crosses it for local and scenic use in the present day. The pass and a section of the road are within the northwestern Angeles National Forest.

Los Angeles County realigned most of the upper part of San Francisquito Canyon Road in the 2000s. The original narrowest and curviest segment remains. The bypassed old section is a hiking route along San Francisquito Creek, passing through the historic St. Francis Dam site and ruins.

See also
 Butterfield Overland Mail in California
 San Andreas Rift — Leona Valley
 San Francisquito Canyon

References

External links
Socalregion.com: Scenic Drives—San Francisquito Canyon Road — images.
 Avoiding Regret Blog: Photo Essay: Hiking Old San Francisquito Canyon Road

Mountain passes of California
Sierra Pelona Ridge
Landforms of Los Angeles County, California
History of Los Angeles County, California
Butterfield Overland Mail in California
El Camino Viejo